Lake Miltona is a lake in Douglas County, in the U.S. state of Minnesota.

Lake Miltona was named for Florence Miltona Roadruck, the wife of a pioneer who settled there.

See also
List of lakes in Minnesota

References

Lakes of Minnesota
Lakes of Douglas County, Minnesota